Scanner is a disk space analyzing and management tool for Microsoft Windows operating systems. It displays the disk space usage of any drive or directory in the form of a multilevel pie chart which can be navigated up and down through the directory tree. When the mouse cursor is placed above a pie the program displays which directory the pie represents, how many files it contains and the overall disk space occupied by it. A context menu allows users to open the directory inside the Windows Explorer, hide and un-hide it from the diagram as well as deleting the pie from the disk either via the Recycle Bin or permanently.

Initially released in 1999, it is an early example of the sunburst method of visualising disk usage and inspired the KDE package Filelight.

References

External links
 

Disk usage analysis software